Allan Chigoma (born 2 November 1994) is a Zimbabwean cricketer. He made his List A debut for Matabeleland Tuskers in the 2017–18 Pro50 Championship on 22 May 2018. He made his first-class debut on 29 January 2020, for Matabeleland Tuskers in the 2019–20 Logan Cup. In December 2020, he was selected to play for the Tuskers in the 2020–21 Logan Cup.

References

External links
 

1994 births
Living people
Zimbabwean cricketers
Place of birth missing (living people)
Matabeleland Tuskers cricketers